The Purdue Polytechnic Institute Kokomo is a satellite campus of the Purdue Polytechnic Institute. Before moving to its current location in the Inventrek building on Firmin Street, Kokomo, it was co-located on the Indiana University Kokomo campus. 

Purdue Polytechnic Kokomo is part of the Purdue Polytechnic statewide system. The curriculum for the technology programs at Kokomo is identical to the curriculum on the West Lafayette campus.

Academics

As of 2010, there were approximately 200 undergraduate students at Purdue Kokomo and 14 full-time faculty. Degrees are awarded by Purdue University. Associate degree programs that do not have corresponding Bachelor degrees, can be completed at any other Purdue University campus.

College of Technology at Kokomo offers the following programs:
Computer and Information Technology
Computer Engineering Technology
Electrical Engineering Technology
Engineering Technology
Mechanical Engineering Technology
Organizational Leadership 
Certificate Programs

External links
 
 Purdue College of Technology (Statewide programs and locations)

References

  Purdue University College of Technology Kokomo website, Purdue University College of Technology West Lafayette, retrieved 6/25/11.

Kokomo, Indiana
Purdue University
Purdue University system campuses